Proteus-like syndrome (PLS) is a condition similar to Proteus syndrome, but with an uncertain cause.It's characterized by skeletal and hamartous overgrowth of multiple tissues, nevi in cerebriform connective tissue, blood vessel malformations and linear epidermal nevi.

It was featured aa the first story in the 7th episode of the 10th season of Mystery Diagnosis.

See also
 List of cutaneous conditions
 PTEN (gene)
 Multiple hamartoma syndrome

References

External links 

  GeneReviews/NCBI/NIH/UW entry on PTEN Hamartoma Tumor Syndrome (PHTS)

Deficiencies of intracellular signaling peptides and proteins
Genodermatoses
Syndromes